One Summer of Happiness is a 1951 Swedish film by director Arne Mattsson, based on the 1949 novel Sommardansen (The Summer Dance) by Per Olof Ekström. It was the first Swedish film to win the Golden Bear at the Berlin International Film Festival. It was also nominated for the Palme d'Or at the 1952 Cannes Film Festival. Today, the film is mainly known for its nude scenes, which caused much controversy at the time and, together with  Ingmar Bergman's Summer with Monika (1953), spread the image of Swedish "free love" around the world.

Plot
The film tells the story about the university student Göran who spends a summer on his uncle's farm, where he meets the young Kerstin. They instantly fall in love, but Kerstin is ruled by very strict relatives, so they must hide their love story from everyone, not the least from the extremely strict vicar. They experience an intense summer together, and Göran dreads the idea of returning to university in the autumn. A twist of fate changes their lives forever.

Cast
 Ulla Jacobsson as Kerstin
 Folke Sundquist as Göran
 Edvin Adolphson as Anders Persson
 Irma Christenson as Sigrid
 John Elfström as The Vicar
 Nils Hallberg as Nisse
 Gunvor Pontén as Sylvia
 Berta Hall as Anna
 Axel Högel as Kerstin's Grandfather

Reception
The film caused much international controversy, because of a nude swimming sequence and a love scene which included a close-up of Ulla Jacobsson's breasts, but also because of its very anti-clerical message by portraying a local priest as the main villain. So, in spite of its awards, the film was banned in Spain and several other countries, and was not widely released in the United States until 1955, although it was showing in San Francisco as early as October 1953.

Awards
Won
 2nd Berlin International Film Festival - Golden Bear
 1952 Cannes Film Festival - Best Music.

Nominated
 1952 Cannes Film Festival - Palme d'Or

See also
 Nudity in film

References

External links
 
 

1951 films
1951 romantic drama films
Swedish romantic drama films
1950s Swedish-language films
Golden Bear winners
Films directed by Arne Mattsson
Swedish black-and-white films
1950s Swedish films
Censored films